State Highway 22 (SH-22) is a  state highway in Idaho from SH-33 to Interstate 15 (I-15) in Dubois.

Route description
SH-22 begins at SH-33 near Arco and travels northeast across the desert before intersecting SH-28 and slowly bending east, passing by some farmland. The highway ends in the city of Dubois at a diamond interchange with I-15.

History
The current SH-22 bears no resemblance to its original configuration. The route of the original SH-22 was based on Sampson Trails G and H from Mountain Home to Trude, which are essentially the route of today's US 20 from Mountain Home through Arco to Idaho Falls and US 26 east from there.

The current configuration is based on the original SH-29 from the 1937 map.

Junction list

See also

 List of state highways in Idaho
 List of highways numbered 22

References

External links

022
Transportation in Butte County, Idaho
Transportation in Clark County, Idaho
Transportation in Jefferson County, Idaho